Franklin Lafayette Riley Jr. (August 24, 1868 – November 10, 1929) was an American historian. The title of his dissertation was Colonial Origins of New England Senates. After taking his doctorate from the Johns Hopkins University he was appointed as the first Professor of History at Ole Miss. In his capacity as a professor at the University of Mississippi at Oxford, he helped to establish the Mississippi Historical Society and later the Mississippi Department of Archives and History. In 1902, he wrote a paper detailing the lineage of his grandfather, Edward Riley, and his descendants.

Publications
Publications of the Mississippi historical society Volume 10, editor 1898

References

External links
 
 Franklin L. Riley Papers, 1843-1930, Special Collections Research Center

1868 births
1929 deaths
American historians
Historians of the United States
University of Mississippi faculty